Hugh Aston , variously spelled  Hugh Ashton, Hugo Asseton, or Hugh Haston, may refer to:

Hugh Aston (c. 1485–1558), English composer and MP
Hugh Aston (fl. 1390), Member of Parliament (MP) for Leominster
Hugh Ashton (died 1522), English churchman
Hugh C. S. Ashton, British polo champion in the 1920s